de La Rochethulon is a surname. Notable people with the surname include:

Claude-René Thibaut de Noblet de La Rochethulon (1749-1821), French politician
Emmanuel-Marie-Stanislas Thibaut de La Rochethulon (1832-1890), French politician
Georges de La Rochethulon (1868-1941), French politician